The 2015 Challenger ATP Cachantún Cup was a professional tennis tournament played on red clay courts. It was the 8th edition of the tournament which was part of the 2015 ATP Challenger Tour. It took place in Santiago, Chile between 9 and 15 March 2015.

Singles main-draw entrants

Seeds

 1 Rankings are as of March 2, 2015

Other entrants
The following players received wildcards into the singles main draw:
  Juan Carlos Sáez
  Jorge Aguilar
  Guillermo Rivera Aránguiz
  Bastián Malla

The following players received entry from the qualifying draw:

  Gianluigi Quinzi
  Caio Zampieri
  Thiago Monteiro
  Andrea Collarini

The following players received entry as lucky losers:

  Ricardo Hocevar
  Patricio Heras

Champions

Singles

 Facundo Bagnis def.  Guilherme Clezar, 6–2, 5–7, 6–2

Doubles

 Andrés Molteni /  Guido Pella def.  Andrea Collarini /  Máximo González, 7–6(9–7), 3–6, [10–4]

References
 Singles Main Draw

External links
Official Website

Challenger ATP Cachantún Cup
Cachantún Cup (ATP)
Cach